Workers with Family Responsibilities Convention, 1981 is an International Labour Organization Convention.

It was established in 1981, with the preamble stating:
Having decided upon the adoption of certain proposals with regard to equal opportunities and equal treatment for men and women workers: workers with family responsibilities,...

Article 1 provides the definition of "workers with family responsibilities" and Article 3 cites Discrimination (Employment and Occupation) Convention (ILO Convention C 111) to define the discrimination. This convention is cited by Maternity Protection Convention, 2000 (ILO Convention C 183).

Ratifications 
As of December 2022, the convention had been ratified by 45 states.

References

External links 
Text.
Ratifications.

Anti-discrimination treaties
International Labour Organization conventions
Treaties concluded in 1981
Treaties entered into force in 1983
Treaties of Albania
Treaties of Argentina
Treaties of Australia
Treaties of Azerbaijan
Treaties of Belgium
Treaties of Belize
Treaties of Bolivia
Treaties of Bosnia and Herzegovina
Treaties of Bulgaria
Treaties of Chile
Treaties of Croatia
Treaties of Ecuador
Treaties of El Salvador
Treaties of the People's Democratic Republic of Ethiopia
Treaties of Finland
Treaties of France
Treaties of Greece
Treaties of Guatemala
Treaties of Guinea
Treaties of Iceland
Treaties of Japan
Treaties of Kazakhstan
Treaties of South Korea
Treaties of Lithuania
Treaties of Mauritius
Treaties of Montenegro
Treaties of the Netherlands
Treaties of Niger
Treaties of Norway
Treaties of Paraguay
Treaties of Peru
Treaties of Portugal
Treaties of Russia
Treaties of San Marino
Treaties of Serbia and Montenegro
Treaties of Yugoslavia
Treaties of Slovakia
Treaties of Slovenia
Treaties of Spain
Treaties of Sweden
Treaties of North Macedonia
Treaties of Ukraine
Treaties of Uruguay
Treaties of Venezuela
Treaties of the Yemen Arab Republic
Treaties extended to Norfolk Island
1981 in labor relations